Scola is an Italian surname. Notable people with the surname include:

Angelo Scola (born 1941), Italian prelate of the Catholic Church, philosopher and theologian
Ettore Scola (1931–2016), Italian screenwriter and film director
Fulvio Scola (born 1982), Italian cross country skier
Kathryn Scola (1891–1982), American screenwriter
Luis Scola (born 1980), Argentine professional basketball player
Robert N. Scola, Jr. (born 1955), judge of the United States District Court 
Vincenzo La Scola (1958–2011), Italian tenor